The 1985–86 European Cup was the 21st edition of the European Cup, IIHF's premier European club ice hockey tournament. The season started on October 10, 1985, and finished on August 30, 1986.

The tournament was won by CSKA Moscow, who won the final group.

Preliminary round

First round

 Ilves,   
 Södertälje SK,   
 SB Rosenheim,   
 Dukla Jihlava,  
 CSKA Moscow    :  bye

Second round

Final Group
(Rosenheim, Bavaria, West Germany)

Final group standings

References
 Season 1986

1985–86 in European ice hockey
IIHF European Cup